Chrášťany is a municipality and village in České Budějovice District in the South Bohemian Region of the Czech Republic. It has about 700 inhabitants.

Administrative parts
Villages of Doubrava, Doubravka, Koloměřice and Pašovice are administrative parts of Chrášťany.

References

Villages in České Budějovice District